Iron Cobra (2002–2010) was a Canadian improv comedy duo composed of Becky Johnson and Graham Wagner best known for their aggressive and awkward brand of comedy.

Performance history
Iron Cobra formed in 2002 as an ad-hoc team for then-emerging Toronto competitive improv show, Catch23 Improv. Their first out-of-town booking was in 2004 at the Atlanta Improv Festival hosted by Dad's Garage Theatre. From there, the duo would go on to tour to festivals and stand-aloe bookings in Edmonton, Rochester, Minneapolis, Vancouver, Nashville, Chicago, Providence and more.

Although influential throughout the Toronto improv scene of the 2000s, Iron Cobra would eventually disband officially in 2010 as Wagner moved to Los Angeles to pursue a career as a television writer while Johnson focused on continued live performance and touring. Their last tour would be undertaken by Johnson alone. The 2010 Without Graham European Tour would mark their first tour of Europe and their last official booking, even though the entire tour happened without Wagner.

Awards and nominations
Canadian Comedy Award, Best Improv Troupe, 2005 (nominee)
Tim Sims Encouragement Fund Award, 2004 (nominee)
World Domination TheatreSports Championships, 2004 (winner)

External links
Official page
Interview with Dave Morris for eye weekly, 2005

Canadian comedy troupes